The Rust de Winter Dam is a dam located on the Elands River, Limpopo, South Africa.

History
It was established in 1920 and has a capacity of 28 million m3 behind a wall of 31 m. The dam is used for irrigation of farms. The name has its origin from when cattle were brought up from the Highveld for grazing in the winter.

See also
List of reservoirs and dams in South Africa
List of rivers of South Africa

References

Sources
 List of South African Dams from the Department of Water Affairs
 Department of Water Affairs list of existing dams, October 2011, visited 10 June 2013

Dams in South Africa
Dams completed in 1920